The 2005 Dodge Charger 500,  the 49th running of the event, was a NASCAR Nextel Cup Series race held on May 7, 2005 at Darlington Raceway in Darlington County, South Carolina. Contested over 367 laps on the 1.366 mile (2.198 km) speedway, it was the tenth race of the 2005 NASCAR Nextel Cup season. The race was extended to 370 laps because of a green-white-checker finish. Greg Biffle of Roush Racing won the race.

In 2004, Francis Ferko, a shareholder of the company that owned Texas Motor Speedway, sued NASCAR, saying they had violated antitrust laws by refusing to have a second race at Texas Motor Speedway, as many other tracks had. The case was settled in his favor, and NASCAR was forced to give up one of its Darlington dates so that a second race could be held at Texas. In 2005, Darlington was forced to contract down to one race per year. Officials replaced Darlington's Southern 500 and kept the Rebel race in the spring, which became a 500-mile race. The race was situated on the Saturday of Mother's Day weekend in mid-May, a date that was normally avoided by NASCAR over its history. The Carolina Dodge Dealers, a consortium of Dodge dealerships in North and South Carolina, continued the sponsorship of this race, having it renamed to promote Dodge's Charger automobiles.

After Darlington was able to return to two races in 2020 as a result of a global pandemic, this race is part of the lineal continuation of the spring race, which in 2021 was the Goodyear 400.

Background
Darlington Raceway, nicknamed by many NASCAR fans and drivers as "The Lady in Black" or "The Track Too Tough to Tame" and advertised as a "NASCAR Tradition", is a race track built for NASCAR racing located near Darlington, South Carolina. It is of a unique, somewhat egg-shaped design, an oval with the ends of very different configurations, a condition which supposedly arose from the proximity of one end of the track to a minnow pond the owner refused to relocate. This situation makes it very challenging for the crews to set up their cars' handling in a way that will be effective at both ends.

The track, Darlington Raceway,  is a four-turn  oval. The track's first two turns are banked at twenty-five degrees, while the final two turns are banked two degrees lower at twenty-three degrees. The front stretch (the location of the finish line) and the back stretch is banked at six degrees. Darlington Raceway can seat up to 60,000 people.

Entry list

Qualifying 

Failed to qualify: Johnny Sauter (No. 09), Robby Gordon (No. 7), Tony Raines (No. 61), Morgan Shepherd (No. 89)

Race recap 
Greg Biffle led a race-high 176 of 370 laps en route to his third Nextel Cup victory of 2005.  With four laps to go, Biffle's Roush Racing teammate Mark Martin spun out (sliding into the apron) trying to pass third-place runner and pole-sitter Kasey Kahne.  Biffle took two tires on his final pit stop, while race leader Ryan Newman and Ken Schrader stayed out.  Newman was expecting more of the teams, like Schrader in the #49 Dodge, at the tail of the lead lap (18 in all) to stay out for track position.  Newman accelerated on the restart, brake-checked Schrader to hold off the pack, and accelerated again, leaving Schrader spinning his tires.  Biffle passed both of them on a green-white-checker finish restart.  Jeff Gordon finished second, followed by Kahne, Martin, and Newman, who fell back three spots in two laps.  Schrader finished in 18th position.

Race results

Race statistics
 Time of race: 4:06:29
 Average Speed: 
 Pole Speed: 170.024
 Cautions: 12 for 48 laps
 Margin of Victory: 0.990
 Lead changes: 30
 Percent of race run under caution: 13%         
 Average green flag run: 24.8 laps

References

Dodge Charger 500
Dodge Charger 500
NASCAR races at Darlington Raceway
May 2005 sports events in the United States